Dermot McCaffrey (born 29 March 1986 in Omagh) is a Northern Irish footballer who plays for AArmagh City.

McCaffrey spent his childhood in Clogher, County Tyrone, and he started his professional career with Scottish club Hibs. McCaffrey made only one appearance for the Hibs first team, in which he was sent off. He was loaned out to First Division clubs Queen of the South and Livingston during his time with Hibs.

At the end of the 2007–08 season, McCaffrey signed a three-year deal to play for Falkirk. Having made only one appearance for Falkirk in over a year, McCaffrey joined Arbroath on loan on 18 September 2009.

On 18 February 2010, BBC Sport reported that McCaffrey had agreed to return to Northern Ireland and his home town club, Dungannon Swifts. McCaffrey signed for the club as an out-of-contract professional.

McCaffrey signed for Derry City on 18 February 2012 He has represented Northern Ireland at under-21 level.

He signed for Armagh City in 2019.

Honours
Derry City
FAI Cup (1): 2012

References

External links

1986 births
Living people
People from Omagh
Association football defenders
Association footballers from Northern Ireland
Northern Ireland under-21 international footballers
Hibernian F.C. players
Queen of the South F.C. players
Livingston F.C. players
Falkirk F.C. players
Arbroath F.C. players
Dungannon Swifts F.C. players
NIFL Premiership players
Scottish Premier League players
Scottish Football League players
Derry City F.C. players
Armagh City F.C. players